Ismet Cheriff Vanly (21. November 19242011) was a Kurdish scholar and political activist.

Background and education 
Ismet Cheriff Vanly was born in Syria, to Turkish parents, his father a Kurdish officer from Van.

He studied Law and Philosophy in France, United States, and Switzerland, gaining a PhD in Jurisprudence at the University of Lausanne, and a Masters in History from the University of Geneva, subsequently becoming a professor in the Political and Social Sciences. He spoke French, English, Arabic, and Kurdish.

Political life 
Vanly worked for the Kurdistan Democratic Party (KDP) from 1961 to 1975, becoming a spokesman for its leader Mustafa Barzani. On 7 October 1976, while acting as the representative for the KDP in Switzerland Vanly was shot in the head in an assassination attempt. Having survived the attack, Vanly confirmed that the gunman had previously been introduced to Vanly by the Iraqi Consul from Geneva. The Iraqi government denied responsibility.

Vanly worked with the Society for Threatened Peoples at the end of the 1970s, and remained on its advisory board until his death in 2011. In 1995 he became a member of the executive council of the Kurdistan Parliament in Exile. That organization dissolved in May 1999 and became the Kurdish National Congress, for which Vanly was declared the first president.

Death 
He died on 9 November 2011 at home in Lausanne, Switzerland.

References 

1924 births
2011 deaths
Syrian Kurdish people
Syrian scholars
Syrian expatriates in France
Syrian expatriates in the United States
Syrian expatriates in Switzerland
University of Lausanne alumni